Irene Beardsley (formerly Ortenburger and Miller; born 1935) is an American mountaineer, and along with Vera Komarkova, the first woman to climb Annapurna, the tenth highest mountain in the world.

Early life 
Beardsley was inspired to climb mountains after seeing the Teton Range during a family holiday as a child. 

Beardsley began climbing in 1953 after joining the Stanford Alpine Club. She describes herself as not a natural athlete, but nonetheless a keen climber who went on trips around Yosemite and the Tetons. In 1956, she married fellow climber Leigh Ortenburger. She majored in physics, graduating in 1957.

In 1965, Beardsley earned her PhD, as just the fourth woman to graduate with a physics PhD from Stanford.

Climbing 
Beardsley climbed extensively in the Tetons and Peru, including making the first ascent (1957) of Irene's Arete, Disappointment Peak, in Grand Teton National Park.

She travelled to Nepal in 1961 with her husband, as he was invited to be a part of Edmund Hillary's Makalu expedition. Once she arrived she was forbidden by Hillary to set foot on the mountain, despite her climbing credentials. In 1965, along with Sue Swedlund, she made the first all-female ascent of the North Face of the Grand Teton.

While working as a physicist at IBM, she was invited to be part of the American Women's Himalayan Expedition to Annapurna. At the time women were often rejected from major expeditions, and the all female nature of this one was a rare opportunity. They raised money for the expedition by selling T-shirts with the slogan, A Woman's Place is on Top. After a month of climbing Beardsley and Komarkova became the first women to climb Annapurna.

Notable climbs 
Mount Moran (1963); assorted first ascents in the area
Palcaraju (1964); second ascent
North Face of the Grand Teton (1965); first all-female ascent
Annapurna (1978); first American ascent; first female ascent

See also
Arlene Blum
American Women's Himalayan Expedition

References 

Living people
1935 births
American mountain climbers